The Coca-Cola Billboard in Kings Cross, Sydney, usually referred to by Sydneysiders simply as "The Coca-Cola Sign" or "The Coke Sign", is an advertising billboard erected in 1974 by the Coca-Cola Company. It is more often regarded as an iconic landmark than as an advertisement. Commercially, it is considered to be the premier billboard in Sydney and is the largest billboard in the Southern Hemisphere. It is commonly, though incorrectly, assumed to be heritage-listed.

The sign

The Coca-Cola sign is located above the intersection of William Street and Darlinghurst Road and is attached to the Zenith Residences, formerly the Millenium Hotel and Kingsgate Hotel. The sign is often referred to as The Gateway to the Cross, because it is prominently visible from all of William Street, which is the principal road leading to Kings Cross from the Sydney CBD. One also must pass directly in front of the sign when entering Kings Cross from either William Street or Darlinghurst Road, the two main access roads. The billboard is made up of two parts: on the right, the famous red and white neon sign, and on the left the more modern, flex-faced sign. In total the sign is 41 metres in length and 13 metres in height, with the right sign being slightly larger at 21 metres in length.

The red and white neon sign is made up of eighty-eight vertical bars of red tubing. It also has 800 fluorescent lamps that are concealed behind reflectors that allow the billboard to project thirteen different patterns. The left part of the billboard is a flex-face style sign and is internally illuminated by approximately 1,000 fluorescent lamps. On 18 April 2008 Coca-Cola Amatil (CCA, the Australian Coca-Cola licensee) purchased the iconic sign.  The Coca-Cola Company (TCCC) had leased the sign since it was built in 1976. CCA and TCCC agreed to maintain the then-existing leasing arrangements.

History

The red and white neon billboard was erected in 1974 in its current location whilst the left side of the billboard was a later addition in 1990. In 2004 the billboard for the first time in thirty years advertised a product other than Coca-Cola, when the left side of the board advertised the release of Halo 2.

On 31 March 2007 the lights on the billboard were intentionally switched off for the first time, in correlation with the inaugural Earth Hour.

On 23 April 2008, four activists unfurled a banner over the billboard in protest of Coke’s sponsorship of the Olympic torch relay at Kings Cross. The banner read: "Enjoy Compassion. Always Tibet. CHINA - TALK TO THE DALAI LAMA". All four activists were arrested.

In 2015, the Coke sign was removed to make way for an upgraded Coke sign. The lettering was auctioned off, raising $100,700 for the Wayside Chapel, but the hyphen between the words was given away via a Facebook contest, and now resides in Lithgow, NSW, as part of a Christmas light display. The new Coca-Cola sign was officially turned on, on 15 September 2016, and uses a lot less power. it is the single largest controllable LED sign in the Southern Hemisphere and can change colour.

References

Buildings and structures in Sydney
Billboards
Coca-Cola buildings and structures
Individual signs in Australia
Buildings and structures completed in 1974
Kings Cross, New South Wales
1974 establishments in Australia